Éléonore Aerodrome  is located adjacent to Opinaca Reservoir, Quebec, Canada.

References

Registered aerodromes in Nord-du-Québec